The Department of Education and Youth Affairs was an Australian government department that existed between March 1983 and December 1984.

History
The Department was established by the Hawke Government in March 1983, a renaming of the Department of Education in view of significant changes to departmental functions following the federal election of that month.

Scope
Information about the department's functions and/or government funding allocation could be found in the Administrative Arrangements Orders, the annual Portfolio Budget Statements and in the Department's annual reports.

The functions of the Department at its creation were:
Education, other than migrant adult education
Youth Affairs.

Structure
The Department was a Commonwealth Public Service department, staffed by officials who were responsible to the Minister for Education and Youth Affairs.

References

Education and Youth Affairs
Ministries established in 1983
1983 establishments in Australia
1984 disestablishments in Australia